Benwell Dene is a Victorian building in the suburb of Benwell, Newcastle Upon Tyne, England. It was designed by Alfred Waterhouse for Dr Thomas Hodgkin and was built in 1865. Hodgkin donated the house to the Royal Victoria Home in 1894, and bequeathed the gardens and grounds to the people of Newcastle as a public park. The building subsequently became the Royal Victoria School for the Blind. After the school's closure in 1985, the structure was converted into a hotel. It is a Grade II listed building.

History
The Hodgkin family made their careers in finance, science, medicine and the arts. Following their Quaker faith, they were also notable philanthropists. Thomas Hodgkin (1831–1913) was the grandson of John Hodgkin (1766–1845), the family's founder. Thomas Hodgkin's profession was banking, and he founded the family finance house of Hodgkin, Barnett, Pease, Spence & Co. based in Newcastle. His primary interest was historical research and his fame largely drives from his 8-volume history, Italy and her Invaders, published between 1880 and 1899. In the 1860s, Hodgkin settled in the West End of Newcastle Upon Tyne, in the suburb of Benwell, and commissioned Alfred Waterhouse to build him a house. Waterhouse had already undertaken work in Newcastle and elsewhere for the Pease family, fellow Quakers and partners in Hodgkin's bank. Hodgkin raised his family of seven children at the house, including Robert Howard Hodgkin, later a historian and Provost of The Queen's College, Oxford.

Thomas Hodgkin donated Benwell Dene to the Royal Victoria Home in 1894. The grounds were given to the people of Newcastle to form Hodgkin Park. The house subsequently became the Royal Victoria School for the Blind which remained at Benwell for 90 years until its closure in 1985. The building was subsequently converted into a hotel.

Architecture and description
Benwell Dene is built of sandstone to a courtyard plan, with two storeys and attics. The architectural style is "Tudor Gothic". It is listed Grade II on the Historic England register, as is the lodge at the head of the drive.

Footnotes

References

Sources
 
Grade II listed buildings in Northumberland
Alfred Waterhouse buildings
Grade II listed houses